Neptis lugubris is a butterfly in the family Nymphalidae. It is found in south-western Uganda, Kenya and the eastern part of the Democratic Republic of the Congo.

References

Butterflies described in 1914
lugubris